Fornever is the fourth studio album by American rock band Hoobastank, released on January 27, 2009. It is their last album released on Island Records. Upon its release, the album peaked at number 26 on the US Billboard 200.

Pre-release
In October 2007, Doug Robb posted on the official Hoobastank message boards and said that they have "Set the bar very very high for this next CD" and that they have "More ideas going into this CD than ever before".

On June 2, 2008 Robb posted an update on their temporary website, announcing that the recording process of their album was almost done and to expect a release date within a couple of weeks.

Critical reception

Fornever garnered mixed reviews from music critics. At Metacritic, which assigns a normalized rating out of 100 to reviews from mainstream critics, the album received an average score of 51, based on 4 reviews.

AllMusic's Stephen Thomas Erlewine commended Hoobastank for moving away from the modern rock mechanics to craft a relationship record with sincerity and empathy for its subject matter, concluding that "Prior to this, they seemed more concerned with airplay than emotion, so it's nice to see their human side slip through even if it isn't particularly pleasant to hear." Scott McLennan of the Boston Globe was favorable towards the band for sticking to what made them successful in previous efforts, saying "[F]ormulaic though the album may be, the band musters enough craft and personality to keep it afloat. The band is at its best when mixing pop melancholy with strident guitar rock." Jon Dolan, writing for Blender, criticized the band for attempting to recreate the grunge sound by utilizing their standard musicianship formula ("the sturdy A/B rhyme, the grandly surging chorus, the self-actualized underdog salvo"), concluding that "Album four is especially monochrome gut-check metal, so flourishes of mellow pianos or cargo-shorts funk are as welcome as a bag of Skittles in a pack of combat rations. Even Kurt knew that soldiers need some sweets." Jordan Bimm of NOW heavily panned the album, saying "[T]heir un-evolved post-grunge alt-rock is just another shitty sonic time capsule from 1998. All 11 tracks feature painfully predictable song structures and lethargic chord progressions devoid of anything resembling a hook."

Track listing

Personnel

Hoobastank
 Doug Robb — vocals, rhythm guitar, bass
 Dan Estrin — lead guitar, keyboards
 Chris Hesse — drums, percussion

Additional musicians
 Vanessa Amorosi — vocals for The Letter (Australian and European versions)
 David Campbell — string arrangements for Tears of Yesterday
 Howard Benson — keyboards
 Paul Bushnell — bass, keyboards

Production 
 Stephen Ferrera — A&R
 Howard Benson — audio production, producer, programming
 Keith Armstrong, Mikey Canzonetta — mixing assistants
 Paul DeCarli — digital editing
 Chris Lord-Alge — mixing
 Mike Plotnikoff — engineer, mixing
 Todd Russell — art direction
 Leah Smith — stylist
 Tom Syrowski, Hatsukazu "Hatch" Inagaki — assistant engineers, audio engineers
 Marc VanGool — guitar technician

Charts

Release history

References

External links

2009 albums
Hoobastank albums
Island Records albums
Albums produced by Howard Benson